is a passenger railway station in the city of Tōon, Ehime Prefecture, Japan. It is on the Yokogawara Line, operated by Iyotetsu.

Lines
During most of the day, trains arrive every fifteen minutes. Trains continue from Matsuyama City Station on the Takahama Line to Takahama Station.

Layout
The station consists of a single side platform serving one bi-directional track. The station is unattended.

History
It was renamed to its present name on November 1, 1966.

Surrounding area
Iyotetsu Bus Ushibuchi Station Exit Stop

See also
 List of railway stations in Japan

References

External links

Iyotetsu official station information

Iyotetsu Yokogawara Line
Railway stations in Ehime Prefecture
Railway stations in Japan opened in 1899
Tōon, Ehime